Phellus is a genus of robber flies in the family Asilidae. There are at least three described species in Phellus.

Species
These three species belong to the genus Phellus:
 Phellus glaucus Walker, 1851 c g
 Phellus olgae Paramonov, 1953 c g
 Phellus piliferus Dakin & Fordham, 1922 c g
Data sources: i = ITIS, c = Catalogue of Life, g = GBIF, b = Bugguide.net

References

Further reading

External links

 
 

Asilidae genera